Kolimigundla mandal is a mandal in Nandyal district of Andhra Pradesh, India.

History 
Kolimigundla mandal used to be a part of Kurnool district and was made a part of the newly formed Nandyal district on 4 April 2022 following the reorganization of districts in the state. The mandal is under the administration of Nandyal revenue division.

References 

Mandals in Nandyal district